Johann Gregor Memhardt or Memhard (1607 in Linz an der Donau – 1678 in Berlin) was a master builder, architect and politician.

Life
Memhardt emigrated from Linz to the Netherlands in 1622, where he probably learned the art of fortification. He served as a military engineer with George William, Elector of Brandenburg from 1638 onwards and in 1641 was appointed court engineer. Under his leadership the Residenzschloss was repaired and a chapel built for crown princess Louise Henriette. In the Lustgarten he built a 'Lusthaus', known from the plan of Berlin published in 1652. From 1651 the Schloss Oranienburg and its gardens north of Berlin were built to Memhardt's designs.

1607 births
1678 deaths
Austrian politicians
Austrian architects